This is an incomplete list of well-known Alsatians and Lorrainians (people from the region of Alsace and the region of Lorraine). Alsatian culture is characterized by a blend of German and French influences.

Alsatians
Jakob Ammann (1644–between 1712 and 1730), anabaptist preacher and namesake of Amish movement
Frédéric Auguste Bartholdi (1834–1904), sculptor, designer of the Statue of Liberty
Hippolyte Bernheim (1840–1919), neurologist
René Beeh (1886−1922), artist
Marc Bloch (1886–1944), historian
Jean Arp (1886–1966), artist
Hans Bethe (1906–2005), nuclear physicist, 1967 Nobel Prize in Physics laureate
Mehdi Baala (born 1978)
Karl Brandt
Sébastien Brant
Martin Bucer
Wolfgang Capito
Johann Stephan Decker (1784–1844), painter
Gustave Doré, artist, engraver, illustrator and sculptor
Alfred Dreyfus, military officer
Christine Ferber (born 1960), pastry chef and chocolatier
Charles de Foucauld
Charles Friedel
Charles Frédéric Gerhardt
Gottfried von Strassburg
Ion Gheorghe Maurer, Prime-Minister of Romania (1961-1974)
Johann Herrmann
Josel of Rosheim
Caspar Isenmann
Valérien Ismaël
Alfred Kastler
François Christophe Kellermann
Jean-Baptiste Kléber
Jacques Paul Klein
Maurice Koechlin
Katia and Maurice Krafft
Herrad of Landsberg
Jean-Marie Lehn
Pope Leo IX
Sébastien Loeb
Philip James de Loutherbourg
Ludwig I of Bavaria
Marcel Marceau
Master of the Drapery Studies
Paul-Henri Mathieu
Yvan Muller
Charles Münch
Thomas Murner
Victor Nessler
Jean Frédéric Oberlin
Jérémie Jacques Oberlin
Thierry Omeyer
Pierre Pflimlin
Jean Rapp
Beatus Rhenanus
Claude Rich
Paul Rohmer
Andreas Franz Wilhelm Schimper
Wilhelm Philippe Schimper
Morgan Schneiderlin
Schlumberger brothers
Martin Schongauer
Albert Schweitzer
Philipp Jacob Spener
Sebastian Stoskopff
Jacques Sturm
Charles Xavier Thomas
Catherine Trautmann
Marie Tussaud
Tomi Ungerer
Emile Waldteufel
Jean-Jacques Waltz
Arsène Wenger
Jacob Wimpfeling
Charles-Adolphe Wurtz
William Wyler

Lotharingians
Raymond Aron
Maurice Barrès
Jacques Callot
Emile Durkheim, sociologist
Emile Gallé
Claude Gellée
Joan of Arc, national heroine of France
Jean Lurçat
Marcel Mauss
Michel Platini
Henri Poincaré, mathematician and physicist
Raymond Poincaré, President of France

Undesignated
Léon Blum (Alsatian extraction)
Daniel Blumenthal
Ettore and Jean Bugatti, automotive designers
Albert Carré, opera director
Henri Cartan
Claude, Duke of Guise
Paul Colin
Robert de Cotte
Darry Cowl
Pierre Dac
Mireille Delunsch
Emile Erckmann
Alfred Faust
Charles Fehrenbach (astronomer)
Jules Ferry
Johann Fischart
René Fonck
Franz I, Holy Roman Emperor
Pierre Fresnay
Émile Friant
Henri Grégoire
Antoine Griezmann
Johannes Gutenberg, invented movable type printing
Counts of Habsburg
Jean-Jacques Henner
Hugo Hergesell
Rouget de l'Isle
Patricia Kaas
Marie Pierre Koenig
Antoine Charles Louis Lasalle, general
Stanislaus I Leszczyński, King of Poland
Jules Bastien-Lepage
Charles Loeffler
Lothair II of Lotharingia
Johanan Luria
Hubert Lyautey
Nathalie Marquay
André Maurois, author
Jules Méline
Michel Ney
François-Joseph Offenstein
Pilâtre de Rozier
Rabbenu Gershom
Louis Ratisbonne
Pierre-Louis Roederer
Richard Rohmer (Alsatian extraction)
Maurice de Saxe
Johannes Schefferus
Francis Schlatter
Victor Schœlcher
Robert Schuman
Paul Schutzenberger
Jean-Jacques Servan-Schreiber (Alsatian extraction)
Sébastien Le Prestre de Vauban
Paul Verlaine, poet
Zwentibold

See also
 Alsace
 Duchy of Lorraine
 List of Strasbourg people
 French American
 French people
 German American
 German people
 List of French Americans
 List of French people
 List of German Americans
 List of Germans
 Lorraine
 Lotharingia

References

Alsatians and Lorrainians

Alsace